This is a list of the winners and nominees of the Primetime Emmy Award for Outstanding Writing for a Limited or Anthology Series or Movie.

Winners and nominations

1970s

1980s

1990s

2000s

2010s

2020s

Total awards by network

 HBO/HBO Max – 18
 CBS – 13
 ABC – 9
 PBS – 8
 NBC – 7
 Netflix – 2
 BBC America – 1 
 FX – 1 
 TNT - 1

Individuals with multiple awards

2 awards
 Jane Anderson
 Charlie Brooker 
 James Costigan 
 Andrew Davies
 William Hanley
 Abby Mann
 Tracy Keenan Wynn

Individuals with multiple nominations

5 nominations
 Jane Anderson
 William Hanley
 Hugh Whitemore

4 nominations
 Andrew Davies

3 nominations
 James Costigan
 Larry Gelbart
 Noah Hawley
 Ron Hutchinson
 Fay Kanin
 Ernest Kinoy
 Richard Levinson
 William Link
 Abby Mann
 Stephen Merchant
 Steven Moffat
 Ryan Murphy
 David W. Rintels
 David Simon
 Danny Strong
 Tracy Keenan Wynn

2 nominations
 Barry Beckerman
 Joshua Brand
 Charlie Brooker
 Susan Cooper
 Michael Cristofer
 Alison Cross
 Neil Cross
 Kirk Ellis
 John Falsey
 Horton Foote
 Scott Frank
 Richard Friedenberg
 Ricky Gervais
 Daniel Giat
 Brett Johnson
 David Karp
 Robert W. Lenski
 Loring Mandel
 Bruce C. McKenna
 JP Miller
 Abi Morgan
 Joel Oliansky
 Eric Overmyer
 Kario Salem
 Robert Schenkkan
 Carol Sobieski
 George Stevens Jr.
 Heidi Thomas
 Michael Tolkin
 Graham Yost

Programs with multiple awards

2 awards
 Black Mirror (consecutive)

Programs with multiple nominations

5 nominations
 American Crime Story

4 nominations
 Fargo

3 nominations
 Sherlock
 WandaVision

2 nominations
 Black Mirror
 Escape at Dannemora
 Feud
 The Hour
 Luther
 The Pacific
 Prime Suspect

References

Writing for a Miniseries, Movie, or Dramatic Special
Screenwriting awards for television